The Palestine Broadcasting Service (PBS) was the state-owned radio broadcasting station that operated from Jerusalem, Mandatory Palestine (now Israel and Palestinian territories) With the main transmitter in Ramallah. It operated from March 1936 until the end of the British Mandate of Palestine in 1948. It broadcast programs in Arabic, Hebrew, and English, with broadcasting time allotted in that order. 

Its Hebrew service, Kol Yerushalayim, which was inaugurated on March 30, 1936, played an important role in the development of Hebrew as a national language for the founders of Israel. While news broadcasts and political commentary was heavily censored, the PBS' cultural programs - including its live music broadcasts - played an important role in the development of interwar Palestinian and Zionist (later Israeli) national identities.

References

External links

Mass media in Mandatory Palestine
Public broadcasting
Mass media companies established in 1936
Radio stations established in 1936
Mass media in Ramallah
Mass media in Jerusalem
1936 establishments in Mandatory Palestine
Organizations based in Mandatory Palestine
Hebrew-language mass media
Arabic-language radio stations
English-language radio stations
Radio stations disestablished in 1948
Mass media companies disestablished in 1948
1948 disestablishments in Mandatory Palestine